The Lao Lom, also called Tai Lom or Tai Loei, are an ethnic group in Thailand and Laos. They should not be confused with the Lao Loum (lowland Lao), who make up approximately 69% of the population of Laos.

Geographic distribution
The Lao Lom have a population of approximately 27,000 spread out over the Loei, Phetchabun, Phitsanulok and Nong Khai Provinces of Thailand.  There are also Lao Lom in the Bokeo Province of Laos.

Culture
The Lao Lom are known for a social way of life.

Religion
Theravada Buddhism

References
Public Space in Tai-Loei Communities: The Study of Socio-spatial Process
Impacts of Land and Forestland Allocation Policy on Livelihood in the Lao PDR: A case study of Pha-oudom District, Bokeo Province

Tai peoples
Ethnic groups in Thailand
Ethnic groups in Laos